Guibourtia sousae is a species of plant in the family Fabaceae. It is found only in Mozambique.

References

sousae
Flora of Mozambique
Data deficient plants
Endemic flora of Mozambique
Taxonomy articles created by Polbot